Ridl Alexis Garay Nava (born ) is a Mexican male volleyball player. He is part of the Mexico men's national volleyball team. On club level he plays for Jalisco.

References

External links
 profile at FIVB.org

1997 births
Living people
Mexican men's volleyball players
Place of birth missing (living people)